Gallocyanin is a chemical compound classified as a phenoxazine dye.  In combination with certain metals, it is used to prepare gallocyanin stains that are used in identifying nucleic acids.

References

Phenoxazines
Oxazine dyes
Carboxylic acids